Hitmaker is a musician who frequently releases hit songs.

Hitmaker or Hitmakers may refer to:

Films and television
Hitmaker (2014 TV series), a South Korean variety television show documenting formation and debut processes of two project music groups
Hitmaker (2016 TV series), a South Korean variety television show
Hitmakers (TV series), a Scandinavian reality television competition for songwriters
Hitmakers, original title of reality television program later changed for launching to Platinum Hit

Music
The Hitmakers, a Danish rock group
The Hitmaker, a Fender Stratocaster guitar owned by Nile Rodgers

Others
Sega Hitmaker, was a division of Japanese video game developer Sega

See also
J. Sasikumar, Indian film director of Malayalam movies known as Hitmaker Sasikumar
Sega AM3, renamed Hitmaker, as part of restructuring of Sega